Mugo wa Kibiru or Chege (Cege) wa Kibiru was a Kenyan sage from the Gikuyu tribe (Kikuyu, in Swahili) who lived in the 18th and early 19th centuries. His name "Mugo" means "a healer". Mugo wa Kibiru was born in Kariara, Murang'a, near Thika, but his exact dates of birth and death are unknown.
 
There are various anecdotes regarding Chege wa Kibiru in Kikuyu folklore, but his claim to fame arose as a result of his accurate prophecies regarding the advent of the Caucasian (white man) on African soil long before British missionaries set their feet in Kenya. Chege's prophecies were that there would come a race of people whose skin complexion would resemble a small pale coloured frog that lives in water (kiengere) and one would be able to see their blood flowing under their skins just like the frog. And these pale strangers would have clothing that resembles butterflies (ciĩuhuruta) in their colourful aspect. And that these pale strangers would carry magical sticks that would produce fire (guns firing bullets), and it will be foolish for our warriors to confront them with their spears. Chege also prophesied that there would be a cultural erosion of tribal customs where Kikuyu youth would adopt the ways of the Caucasians. The Caucasians would also carry fire in their pockets (matchboxes). Cooked food previously never sold in Kikuyu custom, would be sold on roadsides and markets all over the country. The plains where the Maasai graze their cattle would be farmed. Chege prophesied the coming of the Uganda Railway line that would stretch from one body of water Indian Ocean in the east to another in the west Lake Victoria and described an iron snake that would have many "legs" like an earthworm (train), travelling on this railway line, eating the Caucasians and vomiting them when it stopped (train journey with passengers). According to the prophecy, the iron snake would have a bushy head bellowing smoke. Chege predicted with astonishing accuracy that there would be a famine in Kikuyuland that would exterminate much of the tribe right before the arrival of these pale coloured strangers or foreigners.

The Sacred Tree

Chege foretold that the Kikuyus and other tribes would be colonised by the Caucasians but that the colonisation would end after many years (68 years) with the result that the Caucasians would leave Kenya.He advised his peolpel to endeavour to learn the virtues of the White men(Caucasians) but keenly reject his vices. Chege predicted that a giant fig tree 15 feet in diameter located in Thika, 26 miles north of Nairobi, would wither and die by the day Kenya gained independence. Chege's prophecies had proved so accurate that the fig tree was regarded as sacred by the Kikuyus; even the British administrators/colonialists took the prophecy very seriously that they tended to and reinforced the fig tree with a mound of earth, and then built an iron ring around it to prevent it from falling. These measures were bound to fail. Shortly before Kenya gained independence from the British, the fig tree was struck by lightning and began to wither rapidly. On 12 December 1963 when Kenya officially became an independent state, the tree had decayed and died thereby fulfilling Chege wa Kibiru's prophecy over a century earlier.

Literature 

 Ngũgĩ wa Thiong'o, 1965. The River Between 
 
Chege wa Kibiru appears as a secondary character in "The River Between" as Waiyaki's fore-father:
 
"Had not Mugo Kibiru the great seer, in whose line Chege and his son run, talked about the coming of the white man? Mugo told people that 'You could not cut butterflies with a panga (machete or cutlass).... you could not spear them until you learnt their ways of movement, trap and fight back'"- page 20 - 
 
Ngûgî wa Thiong'o, 1967. A Grain of Wheat 
 
Mugo wa Kibiru is mentioned in this literary classic.
 
"Its (Mau Mau movement) origins can, so the people say, be traced to the day the whiteman came to the country, clutching the book of God in both hands, a magic witness that the whiteman was a messenger from the Lord. His tongue was coated with sugar: his humility was touching. For a time, people ignored the voice of the Gikuyu seer who once said: there shall come a people with clothes like the butterflies"- page 10 - A Grain of Wheat, Heineman, 1967, 1986, 2002 Heinemann (London); .
 
"Waiyaki and other warrior-leaders took arms. The iron snake spoken of by Mugo wa Kibiro was quickly wriggling towards Nairobi for a thorough exploitation of the hinterland"- page 12 - A Grain of Wheat, 1967, 1986, 2002, Heinemann (London); .
 
Mugia, D., 1979.  Ũrathi wa Cege wa Kibiru

Controversy 
Some scholars cast doubt on these prophecies, claiming that Chege wa Kĩbirũ must have heard about Caucasians and trains from Kikuyu traders who might have travelled to the coast for trade purposes. And it would certainly have been easy to know about guns, clothing, trains and railways from the Arabs and Caucasians with stories from Kikuyu traders reaching the hinterland from the coastal region where many Arabs and Caucasians carried out their trade. The question would then be; how did Chege know that the Uganda Railway would stretch from one body of water to another many years before the railway was laid out? Chege was long dead before the beginning of the railway construction in 1901. Furthermore, what about Chege's accurate prophecies regarding the falling of the giant fig tree signifying end of colonial rule, the great famine in the late 19th century, and the subsequent cultural erosion of African values and customs? Leakey says that trade contacts existed between Arabs and the Kikuyu for a while, and it is possible that these contacts existed only in certain parts of the Kikuyu nation and not everywhere. Boyes in his accounts testifies that he was the first white man that some Kikuyus in a particular region, saw, and that he was an object of great curiosity. Boyes states that he enjoyed demonstrating his "white powers" by shooting a hole through a soft barked tree with a rifle {Mutaarani, A Kikuyu Reader for Std. IV, 1953, Consolata Catholic Mission Press (Nyeri); Muriuki Godfrey, A History of Kikuyu, 1500-1900, 1974, University of Oxford University Press (London); Father Cagnolo, "The Agikuyu", 1933, Consolata Catholic Mission (Nyeri)}.

See also 

 Kikuyu people

References 

 
 Thiong'o, Ngûgî,(1967), Eds. A Grain of Wheat, 1967, 1986, 2002, Heinemann (London): 
 Kenyatta, Jomo (1938), Facing Mt. Kenya (1938), Secker and Warburg (London).
 Mugia, D. Kinuthia (1979), Ũrathi wa Cege wa Kibiru (1979), Kenya Literature Bureau (Nairobi).
 Mutaarani (1953), A Kikuyu Reader for Std. IV, 1953, Catholic Mission Press (Nyeri).
 Muriuki Godfrey (1974), A History of the Kikuyu, 1500-1900, 1974, Oxford University Press (London).
 Cagnolo, Fr. C. (1933), The Agikuyu, Their Customs, Traditions and Folklore, 1933, First Edition, Consolata Catholic Mission (Nyeri).

Further reading
 Kenyatta, Jomo, Facing Mt. Kenya (1938)
 Mugia, D. Kinuthia, Ũrathi wa Cege wa Kibiru (1979)

External links
 http://www.szirine.com/2004/09/20/the-mugumo-fig-tree-of-kenya/
 http://www.ocms.ac.uk/docs/20051004_Ranger.pdf/
 http://nyerikiambu.wordpress.com/special-professions/
 The River Between, Heinemann, 1965, 1989, 

Prophets
Kenyan culture
History of Kenya
Kenyan religious leaders
Year of birth missing
Year of death missing